The Church of the Holy Name of Jesus on Oxford Road, Manchester, England was designed by Joseph A. Hansom and built between 1869 and 1871. The tower, designed by Adrian Gilbert Scott, was erected in 1928 in memory of Fr Bernard Vaughan, SJ. The church has been Grade I listed on the National Heritage List for England since 1989, having previously been Grade II* listed since 1963.

History

In 1860, William Turner, the first bishop of Salford, invited the Jesuits to make a home in Chorlton-on-Medlock, at the time a middle class suburb.

As well as the growing middle classes, Manchester was home to a large and expanding population of Irish immigrants who migrated to work in cotton manufacturing, especially after the Great Famine. In the area known as Little Ireland, the Parish of St Mary, Mulberry Street was unable to cope; in twenty years, thirteen priests had succumbed to typhus whilst working amongst the city's poor.

The Jesuits had a formidable record of outreach and missionary work, and this was put to good use. Whilst he was rector from 1888 to 1901, Fr Bernard Vaughan SJ took part in a series of debates with the Anglican Bishop of Manchester, James Moorhouse, over rival claims of the Catholic Church in England and Wales and the Church of England to be the Catholic Church in England and successor of St. Augustine. In their jubilation, the young men of Holy Name pulled his carriage from the city centre all the way to the church.

Construction

Bishop Turner was keen to have a church in Chorlton-on-Medlock staffed with priests who could meet the intellectual, apologetic and controversial needs of Manchester. Jesuits from St Helens came to settle, at first in a temporary church (now the site of the Holy Name Hall, which has since been sold). Holy Name was made a parish church to serve the growing populations of the parishes of Longsight and Chorlton-on-Medlock, as villas were replaced by streets as the population of industrial Manchester grew. The construction of the building re-inforced the power of the Jesuit order and the revived confidence of the English Catholics. It is the largest church in Manchester and dominates the surrounding area.

The church's dimensions and proportions are on the scale of a 14th-century cathedral; it is 186 feet long east to west and 112 feet wide. The architect Joseph Aloysius Hansom (who gave his name to the Hansom Cab) based the building on Gothic styles of France. Sir Nikolaus Pevsner described it as

"...a design of the very highest quality and of an originality nowhere demonstrative; ... Hansom never again did so marvellous a church."

Although mediaeval in appearance, it is a counter-Reformation church, designed to teach the faith through its external liturgical and devotional manifestation. It gives maximum exposure to the solemn celebration of the Mass (a raised altar near the congregation with no rood screen, and a shallow, broad sanctuary), the cult of the Eucharist (the eye is first carried to the tabernacle and the exposition throne above), preaching (a large pulpit to place the preacher intimately in the congregation), and the hearing of confessions (the whole north side is taken up with confessionals designed for long hours of priestly ministration). Consequently, the pillars in the church are unusually slender, accomplished by making the roof of the church from hollow terracotta tubes, manufactured by Gibbs and Canning.

Built in brick, it is clad in brushed Warwick stone. It has been suggested that Hansom's original design called for a broad steeple 73 feet high. In 1928 the tower was built, designed by Adrian Gilbert Scott.

The nave can accommodate 800 worshippers. Small chapels adorn the south side, along with the baptistery towards the west. On the north side are confessionals, each with a fireplace. Between the confessionals and the chapels are the Stations of the Cross. The pulpit has a mosaic of the English Martyrs. According to Simon Jenkins, the church interior has "an aura unlike any church I know", and the interior decoration gives an "impression of no expense spared".

Liturgy

At the Holy Name Mass is celebrated in English. The celebration of the liturgy is designed to be catechetical, with solemn ritual, music, hymns and a familiar preaching style. Sunday Mass lasts about an hour. Weekday Masses, designed to suit the student timetable, are at 1.05pm in the church and 6.00pm in the chaplaincy - the latter during term time only. Each lunchtime there is exposition of the Blessed Sacrament at noon, during which confessions are heard.

Music
The organ is located at the west end of the nave. Built in 1871 by William Hill & Son of London, it has 48 speaking stops over three-manuals and pedals. It was completely rebuilt in 1926 by Messrs Wadsworth Ltd and restored in 2004. It is maintained by David Wells of Liverpool. The pipes on the front of the case are ornately diapered and were restored to their original colour scheme of lighter shades of red and green with gold motifs. Above the organ and choir loft are two gilded angels.

Music for the Solemn Mass follows the decrees of the Vatican, and utilises Gregorian chant and polyphony on Sundays (with congregational English hymns), whilst for major solemnities there are classical organ and orchestral settings from the 17th to the 21st century.

Clergy
The bishop asked the Jesuits to close the church in 1985. By then the congregation had dwindled because of local shifts in housing and demographics, and the church was closed for most of the day. The diocese did not want it, so the major superiors of England and Wales were asked to consider its viability. A community of secular priests and lay brothers (an Oratory of St Philip in Formation) came to Manchester in 1992 and since then the church has been in the process of massive renovation project. It is open daily and congregational numbers have increased.

In September 2012, it was announced that the Jesuits would return to Manchester to take over the chaplaincy to the Universities, the Royal Northern College of Music and the church. The Oratory community at the Holy Name under Fr Raymond Matus was relocated to St Chad's, Cheetham Hill where Bishop Terence Brain had granted them permission to establish a Congregation of the Oratory of Saint Philip Neri.

The Smiths
Manchester popular music band The Smiths referred to the Holy Name church in one of the lyrics in Vicar in a Tutu, "I was minding my business lifting some lead off the roof of The Holy Name church".

Funeral of Pat Phoenix
The funeral of locally born actress Pat Phoenix, best known for her role of Elsie Tanner in Coronation Street, was held at the church following her death in September 1986.

See also

Diocese of Salford
Manchester University
Grade I listed churches in Greater Manchester
Listed buildings in Manchester-M13
List of churches in Greater Manchester
 List of Jesuit sites in the United Kingdom

References

External links

Holy Name
Holy Name
Holy Name
Jesuit churches in the United Kingdom
Grade I listed Roman Catholic churches in England
Adrian Gilbert Scott buildings
1869 establishments in England
Roman Catholic churches completed in 1928
Manchester, Holy Name
Buildings by Joseph Hansom
20th-century Roman Catholic church buildings in the United Kingdom
Roman Catholic Diocese of Salford